Surūr ibn Musā‘id ibn Sa‘īd was a sharif of the Zayd clan who served as Sharif and Emir of Mecca from 1773 to 1788.

On 6 February 1773 Sharif Surur entered Mecca and proclaimed himself Emir in opposition to his uncle Sharif Ahmad ibn Sa'id.

He died on 18 Rabi al-Thani 1202 AH and was buried in Jannat al-Mu'alla, in the mausoleum of Khadijah bint Khuwaylid.

Marriage and Issue
In 1768, he wedded Princess Lalla Lubabah of Morocco, daughter of Sultan Sidi Mohammed III and of his wife Lalla Fatima bint Suleiman al-Alaoui.

His known children were:
Abd Allah
Yahya
Sa'id
Hasan
Ahmad
Muhammad

References

References

Sharifs of Mecca
1750s births
1788 deaths
18th-century Arabs
Dhawu Zayd
Burials at Jannat al-Mu'alla